Borinquen or Boriquén or Borikén is the Taíno name for Puerto Rico.

Borinquen may also refer to:

 Borinquen, Aguadilla, Puerto Rico, a barrio
 Borinquen, Caguas, Puerto Rico, a barrio
 Borinquen (Oriente), a sub-barrio of barrio Oriente in San Juan, Puerto Rico
 Borinquen (1930), a passenger liner and troop transport ship during WWII
 Borinquen Place, a street that connects the Williamsburg Bridge to Grand Street in Brooklyn, New York

See also
Boricua, the Taíno name for Puerto Ricans